John Kenneth Svendsen (born 24 March 1976) is a retired Norwegian football midfielder.

He came through the ranks of Bærum SK, where he also ended his career. The winger played for Lyn in the 1997 Norwegian Premier League and for three additional seasons, and for fellow second-tier club Hønefoss for two seasons.

References

1976 births
Living people
Norwegian footballers
Sportspeople from Bærum
Bærum SK players
Lyn Fotball players
Hønefoss BK players
Eliteserien players
Norwegian First Division players
Association football midfielders